Mwadui Airport  is an airport serving the Williamson diamond mine, in the Shinyanga Region of Tanzania. The runway extends along the east side of the mine pit.

The Mwadui non-directional beacon (Ident: WM) is on the field.

See also

List of airports in Tanzania
Transport in Tanzania

References

External links
OurAirports – Mwadui
OpenStreetMap – Mwadui

Airports in Tanzania
Buildings and structures in the Shinyanga Region